Road Tapes, Venue #3 is a posthumous album of Frank Zappa, released in May 2016, consisting of the recording of the two (early & late) shows on July 5, 1970, at Tyrone Guthrie Theater, Minneapolis, MN. The album was recorded as one of the first shows with the (then) newly formed Mothers of Invention featuring Flo & Eddie, Aynsley Dunbar, George Duke, Jeff Simmons and returning member Ian Underwood. This release is notable for being one of the few tapes in the Zappa Vault from this time period, and line up. It is the ninth installment on the Vaulternative Records label that is dedicated to the posthumous release of complete Zappa concerts, following the releases of FZ:OZ (2002), Buffalo (2007), Wazoo (2007), Philly '76 (2009), Hammersmith Odeon (2010), Carnegie Hall (2011), Road Tapes, Venue #1 (2012) and Road Tapes, Venue #2 (2013).

Overview
The track "Nancy & Mary Music" off the album Chunga's Revenge was made up from the tracks "King Kong/Igor's Boogie" and "The Clap (Chunga's Revenge)". Disc 1, tracks 1–14 make up the 1st show and tracks 15, 16 and all of disc 2 make up the 2nd show.

Track listing

Personnel

Musicians
Frank Zappa – guitar, vocals
Howard Kaylan – vocals
Mark Volman – vocals, tambourine
Ian Underwood – alto sax, electric piano, organ
George Duke – electric piano, organ, vocal drum irritations
Jeff Simmons – bass guitar, vocals
Aynsley Dunbar – drums

Production 
Ahmet Zappa – produced for release
Joe Travers – produced for release, vaultmeisterment & audio transfers
John Polito – mastering, 2016
Keith Lawler – layout
Diva Zappa – photography
Joseph Carter – original art

References 

Frank Zappa live albums
2013 live albums
Live albums published posthumously
Sequel albums